Irmtraut is an Ortsgemeinde – a community belonging to a Verbandsgemeinde – in the Westerwaldkreis in Rhineland-Palatinate, Germany.

Geography

The community lies in the Westerwald between Siegen and Limburg at the boundary with Hesse. Irmtraut belongs to the Verbandsgemeinde of Rennerod, a kind of collective municipality.

History
In 879, Irmtraut had its first documentary mention when Gebhard, Count of the Lahngau donated holdings here to the St. Severus Monastery in Gemünden.

Politics

The municipal council is made up of 14 council members, who all belong to the Wählergemeinschaft ("Voters' Community"), and who were elected in a majority vote in a municipal election on 13 June 2004.

Economy and infrastructure

Running right through the community is Bundesstraße 54, leading from Limburg an der Lahn to Siegen. The nearest Autobahn interchange is Limburg-Nord on the A 3 (Cologne–Frankfurt), some 20 km away. The nearest InterCityExpress stop is the railway station at Montabaur on the Cologne-Frankfurt high-speed rail line.

See also
Armentrout (surname)

References

2. Armentrout Family History 1739-1978 by Russell S. Armentrout, Harrisonburg-Rockingham Historical Society (1980)

External links
 Irmtraut
 Webpage about Irmtraut

Municipalities in Rhineland-Palatinate
Westerwaldkreis